Squadron Leader Geoffrey Maurice Rothwell DFC and Bar (3 April 1920 – 5 November 2017) was a Royal Air Force bomber pilot during the Second World War who flew more than 70 missions over occupied Europe including dropping secret agents at their rendezvous.

References

Further reading
 McDonald-Rothwell, Gabrielle. (2005) The Man With Nine Lives.  Book Guild Publishing.

External links

1920 births
2017 deaths
Royal Air Force pilots of World War II
Royal Air Force officers
People educated at Roundhay School
English emigrants to New Zealand
Recipients of the Distinguished Flying Cross (United Kingdom)